Ivanovci  is a village in Croatia. It is connected by the D517 highway.

Populated places in Osijek-Baranja County